The Battle of Danghangpo was a naval engagement during the Japanese invasions of Korea (1592–98) that resulted in Korean victory.

Background
After the Battle of Dangpo, Yi Sun-sin spent the next few days searching for Japanese ships. He was then joined by Yi Eokgi on 12 July 1592, increasing the total number of Korean warships to 51. That same day I Sunsin received a report that the Japanese fleet had been sighted near Danghangpo. He immediately sailed towards Danghangpo to confirm it himself. Anchored in the harbor of Danghangpo were 26 Japanese ships, including another flagship.

Battle
The Korean fleet assumed a circular formation to navigate the enclosed bay and took turns bombarding the Japanese. Realizing that this would only force the Japanese to flee inland, I Sunsin ordered a false retreat. Falling for the ploy, the Japanese fleet gave chase, only to be surrounded and shot to splinters. A few Japanese managed to flee to shore and take refuge in the hills. All the Japanese ships were destroyed.

Aftermath
The Korean fleet spent the next few days searching for Japanese ships but could not find any. On 18 July the fleet was dissolved and each commander returned to their respective ports.

Citations

Bibliography

 
 
 
 
 
 
 
 
 
 
 桑田忠親 [Kuwata, Tadachika], ed., 舊參謀本部編纂, [Kyu Sanbo Honbu], 朝鮮の役 [Chousen no Eki]　(日本の戰史 [Nihon no Senshi] Vol. 5), 1965.
 
 
 
 
 
 
 
 
 
 
 
 
  
 
 
 
 
 
 

Danghangpo
1592 in Asia
1592 in Japan
Danghangpo
Yi Sun-sin